The Screen Award for Best Supporting Actor  is chosen by a distinguished panel of judges from the Indian "Bollywood" film industry and the winners are announced in January. The first award was given to Anupam Kher. Saif Ali Khan, having won the award thrice, has more awards than any other actor in this category.

Winners

See also
 Screen Awards
 Bollywood
 Cinema of India

References

Screen Awards